Elbląg is a city in Poland.

Elbląg may also refer to:

Elbląg County, unit of territorial administration in Warmian-Masurian Voivodeship
Elbląg (river), river in Poland
Elbląg Canal, canal in Poland
Elbląg Voivodeship, unit of administrative division
Elbląg (parliamentary constituency), parliamentary constituency
Elbląg Upland Landscape Park, protected area
Gmina Elbląg, administrative district in Elbląg County